Bonaparte is an Italian surname. It derives from Italian bona (buona) 'good' and parte 'solution' or 'match' (a name bestowed as an expression of satisfaction at a newborn's arrival).

Bonaparte may refer to:

People
The House of Bonaparte, an imperial and royal European dynasty 
Napoleon I of France (1769–1821), founder
Joseph Bonaparte, King of Naples and Spain
José Bonaparte (1928–2020), Argentine paleontologist

Charles Bonaparte (disambiguation), the name of several people
 Napoleon Bonaparte (disambiguation), the name of several people

Places

Australia
 Bonaparte Basin, sedimentary basin across the boundary of Western Australia and the Northern Territory
 Bonaparte Gulf on the coast in the same area

Canada 
Bonaparte River, a river in British Columbia
Bonaparte Lake, a lake in British Columbia
Bonaparte Provincial Park, a park in the area of the lake
Bonaparte Plateau, a plateau in British Columbia

United States 
Bonaparte, Iowa, a city
Mount Bonaparte (Washington), a mountain in Washington State
Little Bonaparte Mountain, a mountain in Washington State
Lake Bonaparte, a small lake located on the western edge of the Adirondack Park in northern New York State.

Other
Bonaparte (album), 2014
Bonaparte (band), a Berlin-based indie punk band
Bonaparte (horse), an Olympic medalist
Bonaparte, the mini-tank from the Masamune Shirow's Dominion
Bonaparte First Nation, a band government in British Columbia, Canada
Bonaparte Indian Reserve No. 3, an Indian Reserve of the Bonaparte First Nation

See also

 
 
 Napoleon (disambiguation)

Italian-language surnames
Surnames of Italian origin